The Salal Creek Pluton, also called the Salal Creek stock, is a small circular quartz monzonite intrusion with an area of . It is eight million years old, containing 52 dikes composed of basalt and was probably formed  or less below the Earth's surface. It forms part of the Pemberton Volcanic Belt, a geological formation that formed as a result of subduction zone magmatism in the Canadian Cascade Arc.

See also
Volcanism of Western Canada

References

Pemberton Volcanic Belt
Miocene magmatism
Stocks (geology)
Igneous petrology of British Columbia